The Mnong or Munong people (Vietnamese: người Mơ-nông) are an ethnic group mainly living in Central Highlands and  Southeast regions of Vietnam, and Eastern region of Cambodia. They are made up of many smaller groups: Mnong Gar, Mnong Nông, Mnong Chil, Mnong Kuênh, Mnong Rlâm, Mnong Preh, Mnong Prâng, Mnong Ðíp, Mnong Bhiêt, Mnong Sitô, Mnong Bu Ðâng, Mnong Bu Nor, Mnong Bu Ðêh.

Every group speaks a variant of the Mnong language, which along with Koho language, is in the South Bhanaric group of the Mon–Khmer family.

Population
The Mnong in Vietnam can be subdivided into three main groups:
Central Mnong: around 39,000 people in Đắk Nông and west Đắk Lắk provinces, 75% population are Christians.
Eastern Mnong: around 36,000 people in Đắk Nông, east Đắk Lắk and Lâm Đồng provinces, 25% population are Christians.
Southern Mnong: around 36,000 people in Đắk Nông, Lâm Đồng and Bình Phước provinces, 70% population are Christians.
A number of Mnong live in the eastern Cambodian province of Mondulkiri where they are known as Bunong (alternatively spelled Phnong, Punong, or Pnong).

History
The Mnong people have been widely persecuted and discriminated against because they were thought to have aided North Vietnam in its civil war against South Vietnam and the United States of America during the Vietnam War. They were brutally massacred and have been neglected for decades for their unproven "Engagement" with the Việt Cộng.

Culture

Epics (Mnong language: Ot N'rong - Ot: telling by singing, N'rong: old story) take an important part in Mnong people's life. Many of these epics, such as Con đỉa nuốt bon Tiăng (Mnong language: Ghu sok bon Tiăng, English: The leech swallows Tiăng village), or Mùa rẫy bon Tiăng (English: The farming season of Tiăng village) are quite long.

Notable persons
Y Thu Knul (1828 – 1938), a Laos - Mnong person, a chieftain who established Buôn Đôn,  a famous elephant hunting and taming village, in Đắk Lắk Province. He caught a white elephant and gave it as a present to the Thai royal family in 1861, leading the king of Thailand to bestow upon him the name "Khunjunob" (literally "King of Elephant hunting"). 
N'Trang Lơng, a tribal chief who led villagers against  French colonizers in a 24 years uprising from 1912 to 1935. One of the most well-known action of N'Trang Lơng was the assassination of  - a French writer, explorer cum colonizer - who was famous with the adventure book Les Jungles Moï (English: Montagnard in Jungle, Vietnamese: Rừng Người Thượng) as well as brutal actions against the Mnong people.
Điểu Kâu - an ethnologist, Điểu Klứt and Điểu Klung - two epic tellers, are three brothers in a family, who collected, recorded and spread M'nong epics. In August 2008, folk artist Điểu Kâu died of old age. This was a great loss for the M'nong people because they consider Điểu Kâu as the keeper of their cultural identity.

See also
 Pnong people
 Funan

References

Mnong at www.peoplesoftheworld.org
Mnong and elephant in Vietnam

Ethnic groups in Vietnam